

Archosauromorphs

Newly named pseudosuchians

Newly named dinosaurs

Plesiosaurs

New taxa

Pterosaurs

New taxa

Synapsids

Non-mammalian

References